Craugastor cuaquero is a species of frog in the family Craugastoridae.
It is endemic to Costa Rica.
Its natural habitat is subtropical or tropical moist montane forests.

References

Sources

cuaquero
Endemic fauna of Costa Rica
Amphibians described in 1980
Taxonomy articles created by Polbot